María Ofelia Villenave Garza, known as Fernanda Villeli, (14 May 1921 – 1 February 2009) was a Mexican writer and activist, who was one of the major writers of telenovelas in Mexico. She wrote for series such as Aprendiendo a amar (1980), Extraños caminos del amor (1981), El maleficio (1983), La traición (1984) (with Carmen Daniels), Lo blanco y lo negro (1989), Al filo de la muerte (1991) (with Marcia Yance) and El diario de Daniela (1998/99) (with Marcela Fuentes Beráin) .

Selected television works

Original stories

Adaptations 
El derecho de nacer (1966) (original by Félix B. Caignet)
Muchacha italiana viene a casarse (1971) (original by Delia González Márquez)
Mi rival (1973) (original by Inés Rodena)
El manantial del milagro (1974) (original by Vicente Leñero)
El derecho de nacer (1981) (original by Félix B. Caignet)
El engaño (1986) (original by Caridad Bravo Adams)
Morir para vivir (1989) (original by Félix B. Caignet)
La sonrisa del Diablo (1992) (original by Luisa Xammar)
Azul (1996) (original by Pinkye Morris)
La casa en la playa (2000) (original by Enrique Gómez Vadillo)
El derecho de nacer (2001) (original by Félix B. Caignet)

Remakes written herself 
El dolor de amar (1966) (remake of Senda prohibida)
El cielo es para todos (1979) (remake of San Martín de Porres)
Amor prohibido (1979) (remake of Senda prohibida)
Corazones sin rumbo (1980) (remake of La mesera)

References

Mexican women writers
1921 births
2009 deaths
Telenovela writers
Women soap opera writers
20th-century Mexican screenwriters